MacKay United Church is a United Church of Canada church in the New Edinburgh neighbourhood of Ottawa, Ontario, Canada. The church is located at the intersection of 39 Dufferin and Mackay at the southwest corner of the Rideau Hall estate. MacKay's present minister is Reverend Peter Woods.

History
The church was founded in 1875 on land donated by William MacKinnon, grandson of Thomas McKay, and the founder of New Edinburgh and namesake of the church. The Romanesque Revival style building was constructed from 1909-1910.

The building was expanded in 1924 and the entire structure was demolished for a new building completed in 1910.  It was originally called MacKay Presbyterian, but became MacKay United, on June 10, 1925. The building was given a Municipal designation under the Ontario Heritage Act, Section 29.

References

Bibliography

External links 

http://www.mackayunitedchurch.com

United Church of Canada churches in Ottawa
Gothic Revival architecture in Ottawa
Gothic Revival church buildings in Canada
Designated heritage properties in Ottawa